Cerruti may refer to:

 Cerruti 1881, French luxury fashion house
 Cerruti (surname), Italian surname